Devils Hill Falls is a waterfall on Devils Hill Brook, flowing off Devils Hill, sited approximately  south of the Mira River on Cape Breton Island, in the province of Nova Scotia, Canada. The falls are located on privately owned property.

The Devils Hill Road Trail
The lower falls are just downstream of the bridge, the upper falls upstream, about  along a path running along the east side of the brook.

The Devils Hill Road trail is actually the old Devil’s Hill Road to Terra Nova. After visiting the falls it is worth a walk further to where the country opens up as the views are wonderful, especially in the fall. Devils Hill road continues  to meet the Terra Nova Road, and while the New Boston road end is no longer maintained by the province, it remains a provincially owned road so is open for the public's use. After about  the road will improve from a trail to a maintained road with a few scattered homes before meeting the Terra Nova Road.

Local tradition explains the name Devil's Hill, and the Devil's Hill Road that runs along the side of the hill, were named so because a gentleman met the Devil on his way home from Mira Ferry, or possibly New Boston, one night after a dance in the late 19th century.

There were quite a few farms along the road that went to the Mira, a few of them owned by German families, all long gone now, returned to forest.

Geocache
There is a small traditional geocache at the falls, located so it is accessible year round, which has been in place since February 2005.

Gallery

References

External links
Victor Faubert's Web Site - Devils Hill Falls
Victor Faubert's Web Site - Views from Devils Hill
Map of falls, trail, bridge and path to upper falls

Waterfalls of Nova Scotia
Hiking trails in Nova Scotia
Geography of Cape Breton County
Geography of the Cape Breton Regional Municipality
Tourist attractions in Cape Breton County